The Caribbean guilder is a proposed new currency of Curaçao and Sint Maarten, the Caribbean islands which became "landen" (constituent countries) within the Kingdom of the Netherlands, following the dissolution of the Netherlands Antilles on 10 October 2010. The Caribbean guilder would replace the Antillean guilder at par and be pegged to the U.S. dollar. In November 2020, it was announced that the Caribbean guilder would come into circulation the following year, but it was delayed several times.

In 2018 the finance minister of Sint Maarten stated that there were only two years of reserve Antillean Guilder banknotes remaining and that the islands would need to make a decision soon. The islands also considered adopting the U.S. dollar or Euro.

Negotiations
The Netherlands Antillean guilder continued to circulate after the dissolution of the Netherlands Antilles and plans to implement the Caribbean guilder were not finalized until both countries would agree to have a common currency The new currency will be abbreviated CMg (for Curaçao, Sint Maarten guilder) and will be pegged to the United States dollar at the same exchange rate as the Netherlands Antillean guilder (US$1 = 1.79 NAg = 1.79 CMg). As the BES islands (Bonaire, Sint Eustatius and Saba) adopted the U.S. dollar directly on 1 January 2011, the introduction of the CMg would mean the end of the circulation of the Netherlands Antillean guilder.

In April 2014, Curaçao and Sint Maarten agreed to look into the possibility of Curaçao having its own central bank. As long as further negotiations continued, the Caribbean guilder would not be introduced. In July 2015, the Minister of Finance of Curaçao, José Jardim, stated that research on a monetary union between Curaçao and Sint Maarten was not a priority.

Former Curaçao MP Alex David Rosaria said that a major problem with the proposed union was the lack of a forum to discuss macroeconomic coordination (as there is for the Eastern Caribbean dollar).

In November 2019, Curaçao Minister of Finance Kenneth Gijsbertha confirmed the introduction of the Caribbean guilder in 2021, and the Central Bank officially announced it a year later.

By August 2021, it was reported that the new guilder would have been expected to be launched in either 2023 or 2024. In September 2022, CBCS wanted the guilder introduced in 2024.

Organization 
The currency is to be issued by the Central Bank of Curaçao and Sint Maarten (the successor of the Bank of the Netherlands Antilles) which is chaired by a chairperson chosen by both islands' prime ministers. The two islands would also appoint six further members of the supervisory board of directors. The currency would be phased in over three months. The -guilder coin and the 25-guilder notes present in the Netherlands Antillean guilder series would not be issued and 20 and 200 guilder banknotes will be added.

References

External links 

 

Guilder
Currencies of the Caribbean
Currencies of the Kingdom of the Netherlands
Economy of Curaçao
Economy of Aruba
Economy of Bonaire
Economy of Saba
Economy of Sint Eustatius
Economy of Sint Maarten
Economy of the Dutch Caribbean
Currency unions
Fixed exchange rate
Proposed currencies